The 2003 World Weightlifting Championships were held in Vancouver, Canada from 14 November to 22 November. The women's 63 kilograms division was staged on 17 and 18 November 2003.

Schedule

Medalists

Records

Results

New records

References
Weightlifting World Championships Seniors Statistics, Page 45 
Results 

2003 World Weightlifting Championships
World